The 22835 / 36 Shalimar–Puri Express is a Superfast Express train belonging to Indian Railways – South Eastern Railway zone that runs between  and  in India.

It operates as train number 22835 from Shalimar to Puri and as train number 22836 in the reverse direction, serving the states of West Bengal and Odisha.

Coaches
The 22835 / 36 Shalimar–Puri Express has 1 AC 2 tier, 5 AC 3 tier, 8 Sleeper class, 5 Unreserved/General, 1 Pantry car & 2 Generator car EOG Coaches. 

As is customary with most train services in India, coach composition may be amended at the discretion of Indian Railways depending on demand.

Service

As the average speed of the train is above , as per Indian Railways rules, its fare includes a Superfast surcharge.

Routing

Traction
As the route is fully electrified, a -based WAP-4 powers the train for its entire journey.

Operation
22836 Puri–Shalimar Express runs from Puri every Tuesday reaching Shalimar the next day.

22835 Shalimar–Puri Express runs from Shalimar every Wednesday reaching Puri the next day.

References

External links

Transport in Puri
Rail transport in Howrah
Express trains in India
Rail transport in West Bengal
Rail transport in Odisha
Railway services introduced in 2011